Ángel Herrera Oria (19 November 1886 – 28 July 1968) was a Spanish journalist and Roman Catholic politician and later a cardinal. He established the Instituto Social León XIII (later renamed Fundación Pablo VI) to promote the social doctrine of the Roman Catholic Church and named it in honor of Pope Paul VI who elevated him to the rank of cardinal in 1965.

His cause of canonization has commenced and he is referred to as a Servant of God.

Life

Early life and education
Ángel Herrera Oria was born in Spain on 19 November 1886 as the thirteenth of fifteen children to José Herrera Ariosa and Asunción Oria; four brothers became Jesuit priests while another joined the missions in China.

He completed his secondary studies with the Jesuit Fathers in Valladolid and studied law at the University of Deusto; he also studied for a licentiate in law in 1905 at the University of Salamanca and also attended the University of Fribourg in Switzerland for ecclesiastical studies from 1936 until 1940.

Oria entered the State Lawyers Corps in 1908 and was later sent to the Delegation of the Treasury in Burgos where he remained for a year. He returned to Madrid and entered the Marian Congregation of los Luises, directed by Jesuit Father Ángel Ayala. On 3 December 1909, he was named as the president of the recently founded Asociación Católica Nacional de Jóvenes Propagandistas. He also served as the director of El Debate from 1 November 1911 to 1933. He was the founder of Editorial Católica, of El Debate School of Journalism, of Confederación Nacional Católica Agraria, and of Centro de Estudios Universitarios e Instituto Social Obrero. Oria also partook in the formation of Pax Romana as well as in the initial steps of the Summer University of Santander. He served as the president of Central Board of Spanish Catholic Action for three years from 1933 to 1936.

He co-founded and presided (1908-1935) the Asociación Católica Nacional de Propagandistas (ACNdP) (Propagandists Catholic National Association), and the rightist party Acción Nacional (named after Acción Popular) (1931), presided Spanish Catholic Action (1933-1935), and edited (1911-1933) the pre-Civil War most important Catholic newspaper, El Debate.

He studied Law at the Universities of Salamanca and Deusto, and hold his doctorate at the University of Madrid in 1908. That year, he co-founded, with the jesuit Ángel Ayala, the ACNdP. On November 1911, he purchased El Debate, a Catholic newspaper established a year before, and he made of it one of the most read newspapers in Spain. In 1912, the ACNdP established the Editorial Católica, a leading Catholic publishing house during 20th century Spain. In 1926 he founded the first Journalism School in Spain, associated with El Debate.

When the Second Republic was proclaimed, he founded the political party Acción Nacional (later named Acción Popular, as government banned the usage of term 'national' by any political party). In 1933, he was elected president of Spanish Catholic Action and left edition of El Debate. That same year, the ACNdP founded the Centro de Estudios Universitarios (CEU).

Ordination
In 1936 he decided to become priest and began his ecclesiastical studies in the University of Fribourg. He was ordained a priest on 28 July 1940 in the seminary of Saint Charles. He was assigned as coadjutor to a parish in Santander, where he founded several social initiatives. In 1944, he encouraged the establishment by the Editorial Católica of the Biblioteca de Autores Cristianos (BAC).

Episcopate and cardinalate
In 1947 he was appointed Bishop of Málaga by Pope Pius XII. He advocated a large number of apostolic and social initiatives in his diocese and his homilies were very often nationwide broadcast. Spanish Catholic Action elected him as its national ecclesiastical counselor from 1949 to 1955. In 1951 he founded the Leo XIII Social Institute, later the Faculty of Arts of the Pontifical University of Salamanca (Madrid campus), and between 1958 and 1967 he presided the Editorial Católica. He participated in the Second Vatican Council in all sessions.

On 22 February 1965 he was elevated to the rank of cardinal by Pope Paul VI, named cardinal priest of Sacro Cuore di Maria.

He retired as bishop of Malaga in 1966 following several unsuccessful attempts to have the pope accept his resignation.

Herrera died on 28 July 1968 and was buried in the chapel of San Rafael in the cathedral of Málaga on 31 July 1968.

Beatification
The process of his canonization commenced on 15 July 1996 with the declaration of "nihil obstat" (nothing against) and he was proclaimed a Servant of God. The official diocesan process spanned from 20 November 1996 until 14 December 2010; the process was validated by the Congregation for the Causes of Saints on 22 June 2012.

References

Bibliography 
 García Escudero, José María: De periodista a cardenal: vida de Ángel Herrera, Madrid: Biblioteca de Autores Cristianos, 1998
 García Escudero, José María: El pensamiento de Ángel Herrera: antología política y social, Madrid: Biblioteca de Autores Cristianos, 1987
 Herrera Oria, Ángel: Obras completas (6 vols., edited by José Luis Gutiérrez García), Madrid: Biblioteca de Autores Cristianos, 2002-2006
 Sánchez Jiménez, José: El Cardenal Herrera Oria: Pensamiento y acción social, Madrid: Encuentro, 1986

External links 
  Biography by the ACdP
  Biography by Fundación Pablo VI, Pontifical University of Salamanca (Madrid campus)
  Official Web Site of the documentary Angel Herrera Oria
 Saints SQPN
 Catholic Hierarchy

1886 births
1968 deaths
People from Santander, Spain
20th-century Spanish cardinals
Bishops of Málaga
Popular Action (Spain) politicians
CEDA politicians
Politicians from Cantabria
Clergy from Cantabria
Participants in the Second Vatican Council
University of Salamanca alumni
Academic staff of the Pontifical University of Salamanca
Spanish Servants of God
20th-century venerated Christians
Cardinals created by Pope Paul VI
University of Deusto alumni
Leaders of political parties in Spain
Members of the State Lawyers Corps
20th-century Spanish journalists